Yan Bingliang (born 3 April 2000) is a Chinese footballer currently playing as a goalkeeper for Tianjin Jinmen Tiger.

Club career
Yan was invited to join the academy of Villarreal in 2013 from Dali Ruilong, as part of the Wanda Group initiative to bring young Chinese players to Spanish clubs. While in Spain, he also played for the academy of Atlético Madrid.

He returned briefly to China, helping Shandong Luneng Taishan win the Weifang Cup in 2018. By the end of 2018, he was back with Villarreal. While still in Spain, he also played for CD Roda.

In April 2022, he signed with Chinese Super League side Tianjin Jinmen Tiger.

Career statistics
.

Notes

References

2000 births
Living people
Footballers from Jilin
Chinese footballers
China youth international footballers
Chinese expatriate footballers
Association football goalkeepers
Chinese Super League players
Villarreal CF players
Atlético Madrid footballers
Shandong Taishan F.C. players
Tianjin Jinmen Tiger F.C. players
Chinese expatriate sportspeople in Spain
Expatriate footballers in Spain